The lawn bowls competitions at the 2019 Southeast Asian Games in Philippines were held at a lot beside the Friendship Gate of the Clark Freeport Zone from 1 to 4 December 2019. It was the sixth time that Lawn bowls at the Southeast Asian Games was held.

Schedule
The following was the schedule for the lawn bowls competitions. All times were Philippine Standard Time (UTC+8).

Medal table

Medalists

Men

Women

References

External links
 

2019 Southeast Asian Games events
Lawn bowls in the Philippines